Rachelle Rebecca Smith (born 18 September 1996) is an American-born Jamaican footballer who plays as a defender for the Jamaica women's national team.

Early life and education
Smith attended the University of Florida in Gainesville, Florida.

International career
Smith made her senior debut for Jamaica on 3 August 2019 against Paraguay in the 2019 Pan American Games.

Personal life
Smith is of Afro-Jamaican and Chinese-Jamaican descent.

References

1996 births
Living people
Citizens of Jamaica through descent
Jamaican women's footballers
Women's association football defenders
Jamaica women's international footballers
Pan American Games competitors for Jamaica
Footballers at the 2019 Pan American Games
Jamaican people of Chinese descent
Sportspeople of Chinese descent
Sportspeople from Pembroke Pines, Florida
Soccer players from Florida
American women's soccer players
Florida Gators women's soccer players
African-American women's soccer players
American sportspeople of Jamaican descent
American sportspeople of Chinese descent
21st-century African-American sportspeople
21st-century African-American women